is a Japanese professional golfer.

Imai played on the Japan Golf Tour, winning twice.

Professional wins

Japan Golf Tour wins (2)

*Note: The 2004 Coca-Cola Tokai Classic was shortened to 54 holes due to rain.

Japan Golf Tour playoff record (1–0)

External links

Japanese male golfers
Japan Golf Tour golfers
Asian Tour golfers
Sportspeople from Chiba Prefecture
1972 births
Living people